Weinland may refer to:

Places
 Târnăveni, a city in Mureș County, central Romania
 Zürcher Weinland, Andelfingen District, Switzerland

People
 David Friedrich Weinland (1829–1915), German zoologist and writer
 , German jurist
 Ernst Weinland (1869–1932), German physiologist and parasitologist
 John Weinland Killinger (1824–1896), Republican member of the U.S. House of Representatives
  (born 1960), German author

Other uses
 Weinland (band), an independent band from Portland, Oregon, United States

See also
 Vinland, an area of coastal North America explored by Norse Vikings
 Weinland Park, a neighborhood in Columbus, Ohio
 Wineland (disambiguation)